Live in Eindhoven is the second live album by American band Death. It was recorded in Eindhoven, Netherlands at Dynamo Open Air in May 1998 and released on October 30, 2001, through Nuclear Blast. The album was also released in DVD format. The performance of "Spirit Crusher" was released as a music video. It was their final release before Chuck Schuldiner succumbed to brain cancer.

The album was not remastered for sound and captured the original sound from the live performance.

Track listing

Personnel
 Chuck Schuldiner – vocals, guitar
 Richard Christy – drums
 Scott Clendenin – bass
 Shannon Hamm – guitar

Death (metal band) albums
2001 live albums
Nuclear Blast live albums